Sune Bergman (5 December 1952 – 30 August 2021) was a Swedish ice hockey player and manager. As a coach he led HV71 to win the 1995 Swedish national championship.

References

External links
 Profile on eliteprospects.com

1952 births
2021 deaths
Swedish ice hockey goaltenders
Swedish ice hockey managers
People from Kramfors Municipality
Sportspeople from Västernorrland County